is a former Japanese football player.

Playing career
Matsubara was born in Shizuoka Prefecture on July 2, 1977. After graduating from Shimizu Commercial High School, he joined his local club Shimizu S-Pulse with teammate Ryo Oishi in 1996. However he could hardly play in the match. In 1999, he moved to Japan Football League (JFL) club Jatco (later Jatco TT). In 2001, he moved to Tokyo Verdy. However he could hardly play in the match. In 2002, he moved to Regional Leagues club Okinawa Kariyushi FC. In 2003, he moved to new club FC Ryukyu. The club was promoted to Regional Leagues in 2005 and JFL in 2006. He retired end of 2007 season.

Club statistics

References

External links

geocities.co.jp

1977 births
Living people
Association football people from Shizuoka Prefecture
Japanese footballers
J1 League players
Japan Football League players
Shimizu S-Pulse players
Jatco SC players
Tokyo Verdy players
FC Ryukyu players
Association football defenders